A Love Story is a 2019 album by British contemporary R&B singer Des'ree, her first in over 15 years. She began recording in 2012, but finalizing the album was delayed by caring for her sick mother, as well as tensions with her record label, stage fright, and personal health problems. She preceded the album release with the single "Don't Be Afraid".

Critical reception
In musicOMH, Nick Smith scored A Love Story four out of five stars, noting the "subtle beauty and emotional power" of the singer's voice that also has a "beautiful power and precious nuance", leading to the album being "a solid and engaging return".

Track listing
"A Call to Love" (Des'ree and Michael Graves) – 4:11
"Don't Be Afraid" (Tim Atack and Des'ree) – 4:49
"Drunk On Your Kisses" (Des'ree and Graves) – 4:30
"Honey" (Des'ree and David Munday) – 4:23
"Love Me" (Des'ree and Howard Francis) – 4:15
"Nothing I Can Do" (Des'ree and Graves) – 5:10
"Holding On for Dear Life" (Atack and Des'ree) – 3:59
"What'll I Do" (Des'ree and Graves) – 4:41
"Fake It" (Des'ree and Graves) – 5:00

Personnel
Des'ree – vocals
Robin Baynton – engineering and mixing
Andy Bradfield – mixing
Chris Cameron – arrangement, orchestration, and conducting
Geoff Foster – recording
The London Session Orchestra:
Mark Berrow
Rachel Bolt
Ian Burdge
Emil Chakalov
Caroline Dale
Ian Humphries
Helen Kamminga
Patrick Kiernan
Joely Koos
Boguslaw Kostecki
Peter Lale
Oli Langford
Gaby Lester
Anthony Lewis
Rita Manning
Steve Morris
Everton Nelson
Andy Parker
Tom Pigott-Smith
Kate Robinson
Frank Schaefer
Mary Scully
Emlyn Singleton
Sonia Slany
Nicky Sweeney
Cathy Thompson
Allen Walley
Vicci Wardman
Bruce White
Debbie Widdup
Jonathan Williams
Warren Zeilinski
Dean Northcott – photography

See also
List of 2019 albums

References

External links

2019 albums
Des'ree albums
Self-released albums